The Gobelins Manufactory is a historic tapestry factory in Paris, France. It is located at 42 avenue des Gobelins, near Les Gobelins métro station in the 13th arrondissement of Paris. It was originally  established on the site as a medieval dyeing business by the family Gobelin.

Overview
It is best known as a royal factory supplying the court of the French monarchs since Louis XIV, and it is now run by the Administration générale du Mobilier national et des Manufactures nationales de tapis et tapisseries of the French Ministry of Culture. The factory is open for guided tours several afternoons per week by appointment, as well as for casual visits every day except Mondays and some specific holidays. The Galerie des Gobelins is dedicated to temporary exhibitions of tapestries from the French manufactures and furnitures from the Mobilier National, built in the gardens by Auguste Perret in 1937.

History

Comans-La Planche workshop
In 1602, Henry IV of France rented factory space from the Gobelins for his Flemish tapestry makers, Marc de Comans and François de la Planche, on the current location of the Gobelins Manufactory adjoining the Bièvre river. In 1629, their sons Charles de Comans and Raphaël de la Planche took over their fathers' tapestry workshops, and in 1633, Charles was the head of the Gobelins manufactory. Their partnership ended around 1650, and the workshops were split into two. Tapestries from this early, Flemish period are sometimes called pre-gobelins.

Colbert and Le Brun 

In 1662, the works in the Faubourg Saint Marcel, with the adjoining grounds, were purchased by Jean-Baptiste Colbert on behalf of Louis XIV and made into a general upholstery factory, in which designs both in tapestry and in all kinds of furniture were executed under the superintendence of the court painter, Charles Le Brun, who served as director and chief designer from 1663–1690. On account of Louis XIV's financial problems, the establishment was closed in 1694, but reopened in 1697 for the manufacture of tapestry, chiefly for royal use. It rivalled the Beauvais tapestry works until the French Revolution, when work at the factory was suspended.

The factory was revived during the Bourbon Restoration and, in 1826, the manufacture of carpets was added to that of tapestry. In 1871, the building was partly burned down during the Paris Commune.

The factory is still in operation today as a state-run institution.

Historical site 
Today, the manufactory consists of a set of four irregular buildings dating to the seventeenth century, plus the building on the avenue des Gobelins built by Jean-Camille Formigé in 1912 after the 1871 fire. They contain Le Brun's residence and workshops that served as foundries for most of the bronze statues in the park of Versailles, as well as looms on which tapestries are woven following seventeenth century techniques.

The Gobelins still produces some limited amount of tapestries for the decoration of French governmental institutions, with contemporary subjects.

Fulham connection
A branch of the manufactory was established in London probably in the early 18th-century in the area that is now Fulham High Street. Around 1753 it appears to have been taken over by the priest and adventurer, Pierre Parisot, but closed only a few years later.

Gallery

See also 
 List of museums in Paris
 Beauvais Manufactory
 Moravská Gobelínová Manufaktura

References 

 Wolf Burchard, The Sovereign Artist: Charles Le Brun and the Image of Louis XIV, London 2016 
 Lacordaire, Notice historique sur les Manufactures impériales de tapisseries des Gobelins et de tapis de la Savonnerie, précédée du catalogue des tapisseries qui y sont exposées (Paris, 1853)
 Genspach, Répertoire détaillé des tapisseries exécutées aux Gobelins, 1662–1892 (Paris, 1893)
 Jules Guiffrey, Histoire de la tapisserie en France (Paris, 1878–1885).

External links

 Manufacture des Gobelins (in French)
 Gobelins tapestries in the Collections of the Mobilier national (France)
 Museums of Paris entry
 Paris.org entry

 

Tapestry-making operations
Textile arts of France
Textile industry of France
Textile mills
Textile museums in France
Manufacturing companies based in Paris
Buildings and structures in the 13th arrondissement of Paris
Art museums and galleries in Paris
Decorative arts museums in France
Arts and culture in the Ancien Régime
17th-century French art
History of Paris
1600s establishments in France
Companies established in 1602
1662 establishments in France
Companies established in 1662